"Six Month Leave" is the ninth episode of the second season of the American television drama series Mad Men. It was written by Andre and Maria Jacquemetton and Matthew Weiner. It was directed by Michael Uppendahl. The episode originally aired on AMC in the United States on September 28, 2008.

Plot 
The episode begins with Don Draper waking up in a room in the Roosevelt Hotel as Betty, his wife, has kicked him out. He goes to the door for the morning newspaper and finds out that Marilyn Monroe has died. Don walks into his office that morning to find all the secretaries very emotional and in distress over Marilyn Monroe’s passing.

Later, Jane enters Don’s office insisting that she has made a mistake. His daughter called asking when he would be home from his business trip. Don says that it is personal and he’s not willing to discuss things further with her.

Freddy Rumsen, Peggy Olson, Pete Campbell, and Salvatore Romano are preparing for a presentation to Samsonite executives. After offering Salvatore a glass filled to the brim with whiskey, Freddy suddenly passes out and pees his pants. Pete then comes up with the idea of Peggy acting as Freddy’s stand-in.

Betty falls asleep on the sofa and wakes up to Sarah Beth Carson, who has come to borrow a dress. Sarah Beth says she has had her eye on Arthur Case recently.  

Joan enters Roger's office and lies on his couch, mourning Marilyn Monroe’s death. Roger comes in and responds insensitively; Joan warns him that he will lose someone important to him one day and it’s going to be very painful.

The next day at work, Jane brings in shirts from Menken's for Don to use. Freddy drops by to see Peggy and realizes the executives loved the presentation when she stood in. Don is summoned to Roger's office, where he finds Duck Phillips and Pete. He is finally informed about Freddy’s accident in the office. While Roger says that Freddie must be fired, Don is reluctant. Roger insists and says that they are going to let him know over dinner.

Trying to pull herself out of her depression, Betty goes to the stables. She sees Arthur Case and invites him to lunch with her and Sarah Beth. 

Later that night Roger, Freddy, and Don go out to dinner, and they let Freddy know that he’s being fired from Sterling Cooper. Although they say it’s a six-month leave, he is fired for good. They decide to celebrate and end up in an illegal gambling club. Don and Roger talk about their marriages while Freddy gambles with some strangers. Don walks to Freddy's table, and, to his surprise, sees Jimmy Barrett standing there. Don punches him in the face for telling Betty that he is cheating. After he is escorted out of the club, Don and Roger say their goodbyes to Freddy, and they go their separate ways. Don and Roger end up at a different club. Don finally opens up about being separated from Betty. He tells Roger that he should move forward because it’s his life.

The next day, Don promotes Peggy to Freddy's position. She doesn’t want to accept it because she saw what happened to Freddy and knows it was just a mistake. Peggy then goes to confront Pete about telling on Freddy; however, he refuses to apologize and congratulates her on her new position.

The next scene cuts to Arthur and Sarah Beth at lunch; Betty has tricked them into going out with each other by not showing up. Meanwhile, in the office, Roger's wife Mona storms into Don’s office, infuriated because she believes his conversation with Roger at the bar has caused him to leave her for a secretary. Jane, the secretary with whom Roger is having an affair, starts crying, and Don says he wants her off his desk.

Reception 
Noel Murray wrote for the AV Club that he is not a fan of Betty's storyline in this episode. He says that he likes how Betty is becoming more of her own character, like when she manipulates Arthur and her friend to have an affair, but he does not like how the show is teasing “will Betty have an affair”. He points out that Betty's arc of her clinical depression is much more interesting and that the show should focus more on that.

The Guardian writes that they were a bit taken back by Roger’s affair with Jane. They think that the show put a spotlight on the flirtatious relationship between Roger and Joan, so to have Jane be the one that Roger leaves Mona for was a bit random. The review points out that Roger has had stronger relationships with other women that he did not leave his wife and daughter for, and we never really saw Roger and Jane together up until this reveal.

Accolades 
Nomination for 2009 outstanding writing for a drama series.

References

Mad Men (season 2) episodes
2008 American television episodes
Television episodes directed by Michael Uppendahl